"Me Love" is the second single by Sean Kingston from his debut album Sean Kingston, produced by J.R. Rotem and samples Led Zeppelin's song "D'yer Mak'er" from their 1973 album Houses of the Holy.

In August 2007, the song debuted at number 28 on the U.S. Billboard Hot 100, making it the Hot Shot Debut of the week. In the same week, Kingston's previous single, "Beautiful Girls", was number one on the chart; this made Kingston the second artist during 2007 to have both the number one single and the Hot Shot Debut in one week (Beyoncé had achieved this with "Irreplaceable" and "Listen" in January of that year). In its second week on the chart, the single rose to number 15 and was the greatest digital gainer on the Hot 100 that week.

Track listing

CD Single

"Me Love" (Album Version) - 3:22
"Me Love" (A Capella) - 3:21
"Me Love" (Instrumental) - 3:17

Australian CD Single 
"Me Love" (Album Version) - 3:22
"Beautiful Girls" (Album Version) - 3:44

UK CD Single 
"Me Love" (Album Version) - 3:22
"No Woman, No Cry" (Bob Marley cover) - 3:44

Charts

Weekly charts

Year-end charts

Certifications

References

2007 singles
Sean Kingston songs
Song recordings produced by J. R. Rotem
Songs written by John Bonham
Songs written by Robert Plant
Songs written by John Paul Jones (musician)
Songs written by Jimmy Page
Songs written by Sean Kingston
Reggae fusion songs
2007 songs